Andriy Savchenko (born 29 September 1994) is a professional Ukrainian football defender who plays with FC Ukraine United in the Canadian Soccer League.

Career
Savchenko is a product of the UFK Lviv School System. He made his debut for FC Karpaty playing full-time in the match against FC Vorskla Poltava on 14 July 2013 in the Ukrainian Premier League. In 2017, he played abroad in the Canadian Soccer League with FC Ukraine United. In his debut season he assisted FC Ukraine in achieving a perfect season, and claimed the CSL Second Division Championship. While in his second year he assisted in securing the First Division title.

International career 
He also played for the Ukrainian under-17 national football team and was called up for other age level representations.

References

External links
Statistics at FFU website (Ukr)

1994 births
Living people
Ukrainian footballers
FC Karpaty Lviv players
Ukrainian Premier League players
Association football defenders
FC Ukraine United players
Canadian Soccer League (1998–present) players